As Is is a play written by William M. Hoffman. The play was first produced by Circle Repertory Company and The Glines and directed by Marshall W. Mason. It opened on March 10, 1985 at the Circle Rep in New York City, where it ran for 49 performances.

The Broadway production, produced by John Glines, Lawrence Lane, Lucille Lortel, and the Shubert Organization, opened on May 1, 1985 at the Lyceum Theatre, where it ran for 285 performances following six previews. The cast included Robert Carradine, Jonathan Hadary, Jonathan Hogan, Lou Liberatore, Ken Kliban, and Claris Erickson.

A London production, directed by Chris Bond and starring George Costigan and David Fielder, ran from 18 August until 26 September 1987 at the Half Moon Theatre. A percentage of the income from the production was donated to the Terrence Higgins Trust.

Synopsis
As Is portrays the effect that AIDS, a relatively new epidemic in the 1980s, has on a group of friends living in New York City. It was one of the early plays, and subsequent TV movies, depicting how the epidemic was affecting gay Americans. As Is opened shortly before Larry Kramer's play The Normal Heart.

This play depicts a gay couple, Saul and Rich, who open the play, and their separation. Rich's firm decision to separate is reversed when he returns to Saul after contracting AIDS from his new lover. Seeking emotional support, Rich shows how people with AIDS were treated by the American family, doctors, and friends. Their impersonal and detached attitudes lead Rich to recognize the importance of the partner for the gay individual.

Film adaptation

In 1986, Hoffman adapted the play for a television production directed by Michael Lindsay-Hogg starring Hadary, Carradine, and Colleen Dewhurst. Both Hadary and Carradine were nominated for CableACE Awards.

Awards and nominations
Awards
 1985 Drama Desk Award for Outstanding New Play
Nominations
 1985 Tony Award for Best Play

Revivals
In 2010, New York's Apple Core Theater Company produced a revival. The play also was produced at London's Finborough Theatre, directed by Andrew Keates. The London production was named critics' choice by the London edition of Time Out magazine, and transferred to the Trafalgar Studios in 2015.

References

External links
 
 
 
 

1985 plays
HIV/AIDS in theatre
Broadway plays
Drama Desk Award-winning plays
LGBT-related plays
Off-Broadway plays
Plays set in New York City
American plays adapted into films